The Duke of Wellington Hotel is a heritage listed hotel within the Melbourne CBD in Victoria, Australia. Named after the Duke of Wellington, it was designed by Richard Dalton for Timothy Lane, a local businessman and carpenter. Construction completed in 1850, with a liquor licence unsuccessfully applied for in 1851 and 1852. It was a boarding house until 1853, when a liquor licence was obtained. It closed for renovations in 2006, and reopened in 2013. It has been cited as the oldest pub in Melbourne.

Official website: https://dukeofwellington.com.au/

References 

Heritage-listed buildings in Melbourne
Pubs in Melbourne
Buildings and structures in Melbourne City Centre
1850 establishments in Australia
Buildings and structures completed in 1850